State Route 427 (SR 427) is a  state highway in the U.S. state of Nevada. It connects the community of Wadsworth in eastern Washoe County to the city of Fernley in western Lyon County. SR 427 comprises the former routing of U.S. Route 40 (US 40) through the towns it serves. SR 427 also provides an eastern link to Pyramid Lake via a junction with State Route 447 in Wadsworth.

Route description

SR 427 begins at a cattleguard on Cantlon Drive just south of the Wadsworth/Pyramid Lake interchange (Exit 43) on Interstate 80 (I-80) in Washoe County.  The highway proceeds northeast from there to meet State Route 447 in the middle of Wadsworth.  The route curves southeast through the town and immediately enters Lyon County.  Passing south under I-80 once again, as well as the Union Pacific railroad tracks, SR 427 curves east to follow Main Street/Truckee Lane into Fernley.  The highway ends at the intersection with Alt US 50 and Alt US 95 in downtown Fernley.

History
Originally, US 40 followed the routing of SR 427 through Wadsworth and Fernley.  Completion of I-80 around both cities (and many other northern Nevada cities) made the US highway designation irrelevant, and US 40 was later removed from the highway system.

Major intersections

Note: Mileposts in Nevada reset at county lines; the start and end mileposts are given in the county column.

See also

References

427
Interstate 80
U.S. Route 40
Transportation in Washoe County, Nevada
Transportation in Lyon County, Nevada